Hassi Bounif (Arabic : حاسيْ بُونِيف ) is a town and commune in Oran Province, Algeria. According to the 1998 census it has a population of 44,649.

References

Communes of Oran Province
Oran Province